The list of ship launches in 1787 includes a chronological list of some ships launched in 1787.


References

1787
Ship launches